Jaydia is a genus of fishes in the family Apogonidae native to the western Pacific Ocean.

Species
The 18 recognized species in this genus are:
 Jaydia albomarginatus (H. M. Smith & Radcliffe, 1912)
 Jaydia argyrogaster (M. C. W. Weber, 1909) (silver-mouth cardinalfish)
 Jaydia carinatus (G. Cuvier, 1828) (ocellated cardinalfish)
 Jaydia catalai (Fourmanoir, 1973)
 Jaydia erythrophthalma Gon, Y. C. Liao & K. T. Shao, 2015 
 Jaydia hungi (Fourmanoir & Do-Thi, 1965)
 Jaydia lineata (Temminck & Schlegel, 1843) (Indian cardinalfish)
 Jaydia melanopus (M. C. W. Weber, 1911) (monster cardinalfish)
 Jaydia novaeguineae (Valenciennes, 1832)
 Jaydia photogaster (Gon & G. R. Allen, 1998) (silver-belly cardinalfish)
 Jaydia poecilopterus (G. Cuvier, 1828) (pearly-finned cardinalfish)
 Jaydia quartus (T. H. Fraser, 2000)
 Jaydia queketti (Gilchrist, 1903) (spot-fin cardinalfish)
 Jaydia smithi Kotthaus, 1970 (Smith's cardinalfish)
 Jaydia striata (H. M. Smith & Radcliffe, 1912) 
 Jaydia striatodes (Gon, 1997) 
 Jaydia tchefouensis (P. W. Fang, 1942)
 Jaydia truncata (Bleeker, 1855) (flag-fin cardinalfish)
 Jaydia? quilonica Carolin, Bajpai, Maurya & Schwarzhans, 2022 (otolith based fossil species, Burdigalian)

References

 
Apogoninae
Fish described in 1961
Marine fish genera
Taxa named by J. L. B. Smith